Paangari is a village in Sinnar Talkuka of Nashik District, Maharashtra. It is on Mumbai-Shirdi highway and many find it a suitable location for rest during their journey. It is approximately 270 km from Mumbai.

Villages in Nashik district